A Haunting is an American paranormal drama anthology television series that depicts eyewitness accounts of alleged possession, exorcism, and ghostly encounters. The program features narrations, interviews, and dramatic re-enactments based on various accounts of alleged paranormal experiences at reportedly haunted and mostly residential locations.

Overview
A Haunting originally began as two feature-length specials, A Haunting in Connecticut and A Haunting in Georgia, which were developed by Allison Erkelens, who also served as head writer. The specials were executive produced by Tom Naughton and Nicolas Valcour for New Dominion Pictures. Based on strong ratings, A Haunting became a weekly series on the Discovery Channel in the Fall of 2005 and was produced by Larry Silverman.

The series has featured several alleged paranormal encounters, including traditional hauntings, demonic activity, ghost attacks, possessions, and cryptic visions. The series covers incidents from various locations mostly in the United States, but five episodes are set in international locations around the world, these are Canada, England, Ireland, and Taiwan. Episodes may be set in houses, apartments, farms, commercial areas, and even vast outdoor regions. Most episodes present several accounts of paranormal experiences through cinematic re-enactments, which are accompanied by commentary from eyewitnesses and investigators themselves.

According to Silverman, the show's writers search for stories and then filter out accounts with enough substantial content. He has further added that the episodes are strictly based on the accounts of victims, although the Discovery Channel did compel the show's producers to sanitize certain case histories due to their graphic sexual and violent content. Billy Bean, whose real-life experiences were first featured in the episode "House of the Dead", claimed that the show's producers left out some of his story and that "some of the content was altered."

Episodes within the series follow a frequently recurring pattern, in which victims of hauntings begin noticing peculiar incidents that gradually become more frequent and bizarre. Denial is most often the first reaction. As the situation escalates, however, and every possible conventional explanation is explored and found wanting, they either contact a paranormal investigator, a member of the clergy, or a spiritual medium for assistance. In some cases, victims are able to successfully resolve their paranormal issues, while in others, victims are forced to vacate their residence. Certain episodes have also featured commentary from famed demonologist and clairvoyant Ed and Lorraine Warren, who have actually investigated some of the cases featured on the series. The episode "The Dark Side" was dedicated to the memory of Ed, who died in 2006.

Episodes

Broadcast
The show originally aired from August 6, 2002 to November 9, 2007 on the Discovery Channel, which produced four seasons of 39 episodes. After nearly a five-year hiatus, New Dominion productions began producing new episodes of a A Haunting in 2012. The show's fifth through eighth seasons were broadcast on the Destination America channel, which aired between October 12, 2012 and March 20, 2016. As of the show's ninth season, it aired on the TLC Network, where it premiered on October 21, 2016 and ended the following year on October 30, 2017. In 2019, the show's tenth season premiered on The Travel Channel. After a two year hiatus, the eleventh season of A Haunting debuted on December 31, 2021 on the Travel Channel as well as Discovery Plus.

DVD releases
Timeless Media Group has released the first 7 seasons on DVD in Region 1 for the first time.

On October 14, 2014, Timeless Media Group released A Haunting- The Television Series: Special Edition, a 9-disc box set featuring seasons 1-6.

Films
Gold Circle Films created two feature-length movies based on cases featured in A Haunting: The Haunting in Connecticut which was released in 2009, and The Haunting in Connecticut 2: Ghosts of Georgia, released in 2013.

See also
Paranormal television

References

External links

 by New Dominion Pictures

2002 American television series debuts
2007 American television series endings
2012 American television series debuts
2019 American television series endings
2000s American anthology television series
2010s American anthology television series
2000s American drama television series
2010s American drama television series
English-language television shows
Television series about ghosts
Paranormal television
Television series featuring reenactments
Destination America original programming
Discovery Channel original programming
TLC (TV network) original programming
2000s American supernatural television series
2010s American supernatural television series
American television series revived after cancellation
Television series by New Dominion Pictures